Northwood is an area in northwest London, England. Northwood was part of the ancient parish of Ruislip, Middlesex and has formed part of Greater London since 1965.

The area consists of the elevated settlement of Northwood and Northwood Hills, both of which are served by stations on the Metropolitan line of the London Underground. At the 2011 census, the population of Northwood was 10,949, down from 11,068 in 2008, while the population of Northwood Hills was 11,578, up from 10,833 in 2001.

Northwood adjoins Ruislip Woods National Nature Reserve. It was also used for location filming of the Goods' and Leadbetters' houses and surrounding streets in the BBC TV sitcom The Good Life acting as Surbiton.

History

Toponymy 
Northwood was first recorded in 1435 as Northwode, formed from the Old English 'north' and 'wode', meaning 'the northern wood', in relation to Ruislip.

Early developments
In 1086 at the Domesday Book the Northwood-embracing parish of Ruislip had immense woodland, sufficient to support one parish with 1,500 pigs per year, and a park for wild beasts (parcus ferarum).

The hamlet of Northwood grew up along the north side of the Rickmansworth-Pinner road which passes across the north-east of the parish. Apart from this road and internal networks in areas of scattered settlement to the east and west, Ruislip had only three ancient roads of any importance of which Ducks Hill Road was the only one in the Northwood hamlet.  This followed the course of the modern road from its junction with the Rickmansworth road in the northwest corner of the parish. It then ran south through Ruislip village as Bury Street and continued through the open fields as Down Barns Road (now West End Road) to West End in Northolt.

Northwood had a manorial grange in 1248, which may have occupied the site of the later Northwood Grange. The monks of the Bec Abbey who lived at Manor Farm in Ruislip in the 11th century owned this grange.  A few cottages at Northwood are mentioned in the 1565 national survey. Two hundred years later the shape of the hamlet, composed of a few farms and dwellings scattered along the Rickmansworth road, had altered little except for the addition of Holy Trinity church.  Robert Cecil, 1st Earl of Salisbury had  of Ruislip cleared of forest.

Northwood, however, elevated and separated from the rest of the parish by a belt of woodland, took until the 19th century to form a village —  in the manor of St. Catherine's were inclosed under the first Middlesex Inclosure Act in 1769 privatizing land which lay west of Ducks Hill Road, including West Wood (now Mad Bess Wood) which was common ground.  A further  of Ruislip parish were inclosed in 1804.  The character of the area in providing for Northwood and Northwood Hills to have the majority of open spaces as opposed to housing land was begun by transfers of open space land to the public as early as 1899.  The open nature of the district attracted three hospitals to move or establish in this part of the parish: Mount Vernon Hospital, St. Vincent's Orthopaedic Hospital and Northwood, Pinner and District Hospital.

Urban development 

A land survey of Northwood conducted in 1565 by King's College, Cambridge, the new lords of the manor of Ruislip, recorded ten houses and several farms.

By 1881, the population of Northwood had reached 257, with 62 houses recorded from 41 people in 1841.  David Carnegie owned the large Eastbury Park Estate in the north of the area in 1881. In 1887, the Metropolitan Railway was extended from Harrow-on-the-Hill to Rickmansworth and Carnegie sold his land to Frank Carew for development for £59,422. Northwood station opened in August that year.  Carew stipulated the prices for the new housing he had built, with the cottages along the west side of the High Street priced at £120. He had hoped these would be owned by the staff of the larger houses. The High Street itself had been a track leading on from Rickmansworth Road to Gate Hill Farm. The first shops opened in 1895 on the east side of the road, and included a hairdresser, butchers and a fishmongers. Carew sold the majority of the estate to George Wieland in 1892.

By 1902, the population had reached 2,500 in 500 houses and running 36 shops. In 1904, the Emmanuel Church opened in Northwood Hills, designed by Sir Frank Elgood, a local architect. It had been built in 1895, originally to serve as a school. Elgood later served as chairman of the Ruislip-Northwood Urban District Council.

Northwood and Pinner Cottage Hospital was built in 1926 as a memorial to the First World War, using donations from the Ruislip Cottagers' Allotments Charity.

Northwood is home to Northwood Headquarters, in the grounds of Eastbury Park, the estate purchased by David Carnegie in 1857. The Royal Air Force took over the site in 1939 for the use of RAF Coastal Command which made use of Eastbury house and also created a network of underground bunkers and operations blocks, at which time the house was used as the leading Officers' Mess, though was subsequently damaged by fire. The RAF vacated the site in 1969, and it is now the location of the British Armed Forces Permanent Joint Headquarters (PJHQ) for planning and controlling overseas military operations, together with the NATO Maritime Command.

A new community centre on the town's high street, replacing an older building, was officially opened by the local MP Nick Hurd in September 2012. The new building was named the Kate Fassnidge Community Centre after the Uxbridge landowner who donated some of her land to the borough, and replaced a derelict dining club that had originally been a Ritz cinema.

1948 Air Disaster 
On 4 July 1948 a Scandinavian Airlines Douglas DC-6 on a flight from Amsterdam to RAF Northolt collided with an RAF Avro York coming from Malta over Northwood. Both aircraft crashed, killing all 39 people on both aircraft.

Geography 

Northwood post town extends into two contiguous neighbourhoods in Hertfordshire named Eastbury and Moor Park. A triangular area of Northwood including the old High Street, Chester Road and Hallowell Road is a place of Local Architectural Special Interest, a restriction to protect the ornate Victorian houses made of high quality brickwork.  Dotted across the area are 22 listed buildings (for their architecture).

Elevations range between 177 feet (54m) to 374 feet (114m) AOD, with many ridges and folds in the land creating an undulating terrain.

Localities

Northwood Hills

Northwood Hills includes Haste Hill and is separated by green buffers on almost all sides, though touches Eastcote Village to the south and had a population of 11,441 in 2008 according to the Office for National Statistics.

The land on which Northwood Hills, Haste Hill Golf Club and most of Northwood now stand was once the Great Common Wood. This covered  in the 16th century, which residents would use for grazing their livestock and collecting firewood. Robert Cecil, 1st Earl of Salisbury achieved inclosure from Parliament and sold  of the wood in 1608 for £4000. The remaining woodland became Copse Wood, part of the Ruislip Woods, a national nature reserve.

Northwood Hills has intermixed in its area the only social housing estates beyond one street of the area; much of its private housing stock was built during the 1930s by the Belton Estates company led by Harry Peachey while Harry Neal was responsible for building the shopping parade in Joel Street. Its name was chosen in a competition by a woman from North Harrow as the land was split between Northwood, North Harrow and Ruislip parishes. The first houses were built in Potter Street.

The Namaste Lounge Restaurant (formerly known as Northwood Hills public house and the Northwood Hills Hotel before that) opposite the tube station is accredited as where Sir Elton John first performed professionally. A picture of the pub appears on one of his album covers.

Each May one of the largest Scout Jumble sales in the country is held by 1st Northwood on the land next to their headquarters, the Hogs Back.

Northwood secondary school and Sixth Form is located in Potter Street (the former name of the school). The Olympic boxer Audley Harrison and Big Brother contestant Nikki Grahame are alumni of the school.

Landmarks

Northwood Grange
Northwood Grange incorporates a 15th-century block with a crown-post roof, a cross-wing of the same date, and a long range of about 1600.  This is now the Hall School, Northwood.

Tree Trunk Sculptures
The Tree trunk sculptures are sulpted logs that are placed on Green Lane, diagonally opposite Northwood Station.

London School of Theology
The London School of Theology is an English interdenominational evangelical theological college.

Northwood Hills tube station

This early 20th century built construction is a local landmark, built in neatly to the street façade of the high street.

Demography
According to the 2011 census, people of White British ethnicity made up 55% of the population. People of Indian ethnicity made up the second largest group at 19%.

Transport 
The area is served by Northwood, Northwood Hills and Moor Park London Underground stations, on the Metropolitan line.

The area is also served by Transport for London contracted bus routes 282, 331 and H11, connecting the area to Ruislip, Harrow, Northolt, Denham, Greenford, Uxbridge and Ealing Hospital.

The area is also served by Arriva Shires & Essex route 8 connecting the area to South Oxhey, Watford, Leavesden and Abbots Langley.

This area is also served by Red Eagle Buses, which terminate at Mount Vernon Hospital with the R1 to Maple Cross and the R2 to Chorleywood - through Harefield and Rickmansworth.

Schools 
See the List of schools in Hillingdon.

Culture and community

A local residents' association and chamber of commerce joined forces in May 2010 calling for greater recognition of the area. In May 2011, the London Borough of Hillingdon announced Northwood Hills would receive £400,000 in funding for regeneration work.

Sport 
The area is home to Northwood F.C. who play at Chestnut Avenue and play in the Isthmian League South Central Division as of the 2018/2019 season, Northwood Town Cricket Club also play at the same location in the Hertfordshire Cricket League. Northwood Cricket Club play at their Ducks Hill Road ground and are a club in the Saracens Hertfordshire Premier League.

Local government 
Northwood was part of the ancient parish of Ruislip and became part of the Ruislip-Northwood Urban District in 1904. The urban district was abolished in 1965 and merged with others to become part of the London Borough of Hillingdon in Greater London. Northwood has three elected local Councillors: Cllr Scott Seaman-Digby (first elected 1998), Cllr Richard Lewis (first elected 2002) and Cllr Carol Melvin (first elected 2008).

The Member of Parliament (MP) for the constituency of Ruislip, Northwood and Pinner is currently David Simmonds, who was elected in the December 2019 general election with 55.6% of the vote. The current voting constituency was created from the former Ruislip-Northwood and parts of the Harrow West constituency, for the 6 May 2010 general election.

Notable people 
 Actress Kathleen Byron (1921–2009) lived in Northwood at the time of her death
 Television and radio presenter Fearne Cotton was born in Northwood and attended Haydon School, Northwood Hills
 Sir William Dickson (1898–1987), former head of the British armed forces, was born in Northwood
 Former Big Brother contestant Nikki Grahame (1982–2021) was born and raised in Northwood 
 Artist Roger Hilton (1911–1975), post-war pioneer of abstract art, was born in Northwood
 Film director Derek Jarman (1942–1994), whose credits include Jubilee and The Tempest (1979), was born in Northwood
 George W. Jones, printer and type designer, buried at Holy Trinity Church
 Actor Geoffrey Keen (1916–2005) lived in Northwood at the time of his death
 Actress Betty Marsden (1919–1998) lived in Northwood at the time of her death
 Actor David Quilter was born in Northwood
 Actor Arnold Ridley (1896–1984), best known as Private Charles Godfrey in BBC sitcom Dad's Army, lived in Northwood
 Actress Patsy Smart (1918–1996) lived in Northwood at the time of her death
 Character actor Geoffrey Toone (1910–2005) lived in Northwood at the time of his death
 The singer Elena Tonra grew up in Northwood.
 Double agent George Blake (1922–2020) lived in Northwood after escaping from Nazi-occupied Netherlands.
 Theatre director and co-artistic director of performance company Clod Ensemble Suzy Willson was born in Northwood.
 Scientist Louis Harold Gray (1905–1965) worked at the Mount Vernon Hospital and died in Northwood in 1965.

References

Notes

Citations

Bibliography 
 Bowlt, Eileen. M. (1994) Ruislip Past. London: Historical Publications 
 Bowlt, Eileen. M. (2007) Around Ruislip, Eastcote, Northwood, Ickenham & Harefield. Stroud: Sutton Publishing 
 Cotton, Carolynne. (1994) Uxbridge Past. London: Historical Publications 
 Mills, Anthony David (2001). Dictionary of London Place Names. Oxford University Press.

External links

 Northwood Hills Residents Association

Areas of London
Districts of the London Borough of Hillingdon
Places formerly in Middlesex
District centres of London

hi:नॉर्थवुड हिल्स